Gary Paul Michael Roberts (born 5 April 1960) is a Welsh retired professional footballer who played as a forward and winger. As a player, he is best remembered for his six years in the Football League with Brentford, for whom he made over 220 appearances and is a member of the club's Hall of Fame. After retiring as a player, Roberts turned to management and spent 13 years as manager of Cambridge City.

Club career

Brentford 
Roberts was born in Rhyl, Wales. He began his career at Isthmian League First Division club Wembley and secured a £6,000 move to the Football League with Third Division club Brentford in October 1980. He made 19 appearances and scored three goals in the 1980–81 season. Following the departure of David Crown, Roberts was a regular during the following season, playing as a left winger, despite being right-footed. He also served as the club's PFA representative. Roberts came to the fore during the 1982–83 season, scoring 17 goals and amassing a career-high 58 appearances. He followed up with another 15 goals in 1983–84 and won the Midweek Sports Special Goal of the Month award for his finish in a 4–1 League Cup second round first leg defeat to First Division club Liverpool.

During the 1984–85 pre-season, Roberts suffered a fractured ankle under a heavy challenge from Tottenham Hotspur defender Graham Roberts during a friendly match. Roberts played the entire season with the aid of cortisone injections and painkillers and scored 18 goals in 15 appearances. He scored a hat-trick against Gillingham and scoring four in the 6–0 rout of Newport County in the Football League Trophy Southern Area final, which included a three-minute hat-trick either side of half time. Needing to raise transfer funds, Roberts was transfer-listed by manager Frank McLintock and moves to Derby County and Bradford City fell through.

Following rehabilitation on the ankle, Roberts again had to resort to painkillers and managed just three appearances during the 1985–86 season. He retired from professional football at the end of the campaign and made 224 appearances and scored 63 goals during his six years with the Bees. Roberts received a testimonial in May 1989, which raised £7,000 and was he inducted into the Brentford Hall of Fame in February 2020.

Non-League football 
In 1986, Roberts dropped into non-League football to sign for Conference club Barnet in 1986, but he was only a bit-part player during the 1986–87 season, which saw the Bees narrowly miss out on promotion to the Football League after as finishing runners-up to Scarborough. Spells with other Conference clubs Maidstone United and Welling United followed before Roberts dropped down to the Isthmian League Premier Division to sign for Hitchin Town late in the 1987–88 season. He signed for St Albans City in 1988 and three goals in five games before departing the club. 

Concurrently with his non-League career, as a serving officer, Roberts turned down an offer from Metropolitan Police and instead played for the Hertfordshire police team. He represented both the British and English police teams, captaining the former. Alternating spells with Stevenage Borough and Baldock Town followed from the late 1980s to the mid-1990s. Spells with Southern League clubs Cambridge City and Braintree Town followed, plus a second spell with Hitchin Town, before Roberts retired from football in 1996, following a short stint with Bishop's Stortford.

International career 
Roberts won one cap for the Wales U21 team.

Management career

Baldock Town 
Roberts took over as joint-manager of former club Baldock Town in 1999. Working alongside Steve Cook, the pair managed the Southern League First Division East club , winning The Herts Senior Cup just prior to it folding in 2001.

St Albans City 
Roberts again returned to one of his former clubs, St Albans City, to take over as assistant alongside manager Steve Cook in 2001. A mid-table finish followed in the 2001–02 season, bu the pair were sacked in December 2002, with the club top of the Isthmian League Premier Division table.

Cambridge City 
Roberts took over as manager of Cambridge City in January 2003. In what remained of the 2002–03 season, he steered the club away from relegation from the Southern League Premier Division. An eighth-place finish followed in 2003–04, before a restructuring of the non-league pyramid in 2004 saw the Lilywhites playing in the newly formed Conference South for the 2004–05 season. Roberts led the club to a second-place finish, but the season ended in a defeat to Eastbourne Borough in the playoff semi-finals, and a club record breaking run in the FA Cup losing narrowly in the 2nd Round Proper to MK Dons 1–0.

Roberts kept City in the Conference South for three further seasons before getting demoted back to the Southern League Premier Division in 2008, due to irregularities with the club's Milton Road ground. Over the following six seasons, Roberts guided City to five top-six finishes and a memorable run to the first round proper of the FA Cup in the 2012–13 season, taking League One club Milton Keynes Dons to a replay before being knocked out. He stepped down as manager at the end of the 2015–16 season.

Personal life 
Prior to becoming a professional footballer, Roberts worked as a bricklayer. During his time with Brentford, he settled in Baldock. After dropping out of professional football in 1986, Roberts worked for an insurance company in London and joined the police in June 1988. He served with the Hertfordshire Constabulary until he took early retirement in 2014. As of October 2022, Roberts was living in Rutland.

Career statistics

Honours 

 Brentford Hall of Fame

References

External links 
 

1960 births
Living people
Welsh footballers
Association football forwards
Brentford F.C. players
English Football League players
Barnet F.C. players
Maidstone United F.C. (1897) players
Welling United F.C. players
Hitchin Town F.C. players
Stevenage F.C. players
Cambridge City F.C. players
Wembley F.C. players
Cambridge City F.C. managers
Braintree Town F.C. players
Isthmian League players
Southern Football League players
Sportspeople from Rhyl
St Albans City F.C. players
Baldock Town F.C. players
Bishop's Stortford F.C. players
Baldock Town F.C. managers
St Albans City F.C. managers
Southern Football League managers
Isthmian League managers
National League (English football) managers
Welsh football managers
British bricklayers